"Strength of a Woman" is a song recorded by Jamaican-American reggae artist Shaggy. It was written by Shaggy, Shaun "Sting International" Pizzonia, Christopher Birch, Ricardo Ducent, Michael Fletcher, Shaun Darson, and Robert Browne for his sixth studio album Lucky Day (2002), while production was helmed by Pizzonia. The song was released as the album's second single in 2003 and became a top 20 hit in Austria and Italy.

Track listing

Notes
 denotes remix producer

Charts

References

Shaggy (musician) songs
2003 singles
Reggae songs
MCA Records singles
2002 songs
Songs written by Shaggy (musician)